Holy Cross Church, Morton is a Grade II listed parish church in the Church of England in Morton, Derbyshire.

History
The church dates from the late 13th century but was heavily rebuilt in 1850 by the contractor C. Lindley of Mansfield to the designs of the architect Thomas Chambers Hine. It reopened on 1 January 1851.

Parish status
The church is in a joint parish with:
St Peter's Church, Stonebroom
St Leonard's Church, Shirland

Organ
A barrel organ by Flight and Robson was obtained in 1851. This was sold in 1864 to make way for a new pipe organ by Brindley. A specification of the organ can be found on the National Pipe Organ Register.

Bells
The church tower contains a ring of 6 bells with the tenor dating from ca. 1500.

See also
Grade II* listed buildings in North East Derbyshire
Listed buildings in Morton, Derbyshire

References

Morton
Morton
Churches completed in 1850
Thomas Chambers Hine buildings